A Behanding in Spokane is a 2010 black comedy by British-Irish playwright Martin McDonagh. It premiered at the Schoenfeld Theatre on Broadway in 2010.  Set in the fictional town of Tarlington, Ohio, it is McDonagh's first play to be set in the United States.

Plot synopsis
A mysterious man named Carmichael has been searching for his missing left hand for 27 years. Two bickering lovebirds, Toby and Marilyn, claim to be in possession of his long-ago severed appendage, and look to collect the reward that Carmichael is offering for its return. An eccentric hotel clerk, Mervyn, gets in the middle of the transaction, and his presence threatens to spoil the proceedings.

Production
A Behanding in Spokane opened on Broadway at the Schoenfeld Theatre on 15 February 2010 in previews, officially on 4 March 2010, and closed on 6 June 2010 after 108 performances.

Directed by John Crowley, the cast featured Christopher Walken as Carmichael, Sam Rockwell as Mervyn, Anthony Mackie as Toby and Zoe Kazan as Marilyn. This is the first play that McDonagh has set in the United States.

Critical response
Hilton Als, reviewing for The New Yorker, wrote: "The play is engineered for success, and McDonagh’s stereotypical view of black maleness is a significant part of that engineering....McDonagh adds gag after gag to the show, as if he believed that comedy could cover up the real horror at its core: the fact that blackness is, for him, a Broadway prop, an easy way of establishing a hierarchy. Like any smart immigrant, McDonagh knows that by going after Toby’s otherness he becomes less of an outsider himself."

Ben Brantley, in his review for The New York Times noted that the typical McDonagh characters "start to seem alarmingly like figures from a conventional Hollywood caper comedy about dopey, foul-mouthed crooks who keep tripping over themselves... If Mr. McDonagh hasn’t provided the kind of exhilarating, nasty fun house we have come to expect of him, we are at least allowed to spend shivery time in that shabby, scary labyrinth that exists behind Carmichael’s glassy forehead."

Awards and nominations 
Walken was nominated for the 2010 Tony Award for Best Performance by a Leading Actor in a Play, the 2010 Outer Critics Circle Award, Outstanding Actor in a Play, and the Drama Desk Award, Outstanding Actor in a Play. The play was nominated for the 2010 Drama League Award, Distinguished Production of a Play.

References

External links
 
 

2010 plays
Broadway plays
Comedy plays
Plays by Martin McDonagh
Plays set in the United States